Ilex conocarpa is a species in the genus Ilex of the family Aquifoliaceae. It is native to Brazil, typically in Cerrado vegetation.

References

conocarpa
Flora of Brazil
Flora of the Cerrado